Samuel Okudzeto Ablakwa (born August 11, 1980) is the Member of Parliament for the North Tongu in the Volta region. He served as a deputy minister of state under both John Atta Mills and John Dramani Mahama.

Early life and education 
Samuel Okudzeto Ablakwa was born on 11 August 1980 and hails from Aveyime-Battor in the Volta Region of Ghana. He is an old student of the Presbyterian Boys' Senior Secondary School - Legon ( Presec-Legon) also served as Vice President of the scripture union.

He attended the University of Ghana, and had a Bachelor of Arts in Political Science and Philosophy between 2002 and 2006.  At the University of Leicester, he had his Master of Arts in Communication Media ,and Public Relations. Project Management Practitioner - (PRINCE 2).

Ablakwa also holds a certificate in Leadership from the Harvard Kennedy School of Governance, USA and a Master of Science in Defense and International Politics from the Ghana Armed Forces Command and Staff College.

Politics 
He served as President of the National Union of Ghana Students (NUGS) from 2005 to 2006 whilst he was a student in the University of Ghana. He was also a member of the team that drafted his party's youth policies in the NDC's manifesto for the 2008 campaign. He was a member of the Committee for Joint Action (CJA) a pro-masses pressure group. He is an Accredited Member (APR)of the Institute of Public Relations (IPR) ,Ghana.

Member of Parliament 
Ablakwa entered politics at an early age of 28 when he contested for the parliamentary elections for the North Tongu seat on the ticket of the National Democratic Congress in 2008. He won the seat by a 78.6% of the votes cast. He again won the seat in the 2012 elections by a larger number, representing 90.5% of the votes cast. He retained his seat once again in the 2016 elections even though his party lost the Presidential Elections   He has been a member of the appointments committee for twotimees no,w in 2017 and 202y. He is currently also therRankingmMember of Parliament's Foreign Affairs Committee.

Deputy Minister of State 
In his foray in national politics, he was a member of the then-candidate John Evans Atta Mills Campaign Communication Team and until his appointment as Deputy Minister for Information at the age of 28 under the presidency of the late John Atta Mills, served on Government's Transition Team as Acting Secretary. Ablakwa served as deputy Minister for Education in charge of Tertiary Education under then Minister of Education Prof. Jane Naana Opoku Agyemang under the John Dramani Mahama Government.

Honours

Awards 
Mr. Okudzeto Ablakwa has received numerous awards including the TNG Corporate Excellence Awards - Accra, 2010, Outstanding Youth Leader in West Africa by the West Africa Students' Union (WASU) - Kaduna, Nigeria 2009, Special Alumnus Award by the National Union of Ghana Students' (NUGS) - 2009, Old Vandal Award - 2008, Award of recognition by the Volta Hall JCR of the University of Ghana – 2005 and a special Fellow of the Private University Students Association of Ghana (PUSAG). He has also been honored by the Mepe Traditional Council and the Tepa Traditional Council where he is known as the "Mmrantiehene."

Employment 
Deputy Minister of Information, 2009-2013 (Government of Ghana).

Deputy Minister of Education, 2013-2016 (Government of Ghana).

Member of Parliament, 2009 - till date (Office of Parliament).

Saavi Solutions, managing director (2007-2009).

Personal life 
He is married to Nuhela Seidu, daughter of Mumuni Abudu Seidu a legal practitioner and they have a daughter and a son.

Philanthropy 
In August 2022, he granted a full scholarship to Samelia Mekporsigbe, an 8-year old class 3 pupil of Battor DA Primary School. She won the 2022 Volta Regional Competition organized by USAID Learning Initiative. She emerged as the overall best student at the circuit, district and regional levels.

References

External links
 www.okudzetoablakwa.com Official web page

Living people
Presbyterian Boys' Senior High School alumni
Ghanaian MPs 2013–2017
Ghanaian MPs 2017–2021
National Democratic Congress (Ghana) politicians
University of Ghana alumni
University of Leicester
1980 births
Ewe people
Ghanaian MPs 2021–2025